The katrana (Rheocles alaotrensis) is a species of fish in the Bedotiidae family. It is endemic to the basin of Lake Alaotra in Madagascar.  Its natural habitats are rivers and freshwater lakes. It is threatened by habitat loss. This species was described by Jacques Pellegrin as Atherina alaotrensis with the type locality of Lake Aloatra.

Sources

Katrana
Freshwater fish of Madagascar
Taxonomy articles created by Polbot
Taxa named by Jacques Pellegrin
Fish described in 1914